The Iberian Plate with the microcontinent Iberia encompassed not only the Iberian Peninsula but also Corsica, Sardinia, the Balearic Islands, and the Briançonnais zone of  the Penninic nappes of the Alps. The Iberian plate is a part of the Eurasian plate.

Neoproterozoic
The Iberian plate came into existence during the Cadomian Orogeny of the late Neoproterozoic, about 650–550 Ma, on the margin of the Gondwana continent, involving the collisions and accretion of the island arcs of the Central Iberian Plate, Ossa-Morena Plate, South Portuguese Plate. The three plates have never separated substantially from each other since that time .

Mesozoic
In the Mesozoic, Late Jurassic Africa started moving east, and the Alpine Tethys opened. Subsidence related to this caused deep deposits of sediments on the east and some sediment remnants in pop downs in central parts of Spain. Two stages of rifting occurred in the east, one from Later Permian to Triassic, and the second from Late Jurassic to early Cretaceous.

On the south side deposits of carbonates and clastic sediments formed a shelf in shallow water during late Triassic and Liassic times. This was rifted in Toarcian times (Early Jurassic 190 Ma). Active rifting was complete by 160 Ma. After this thermal subsidence occurred till the end of Cretaceous.  During this time rifting separated North America from Africa forming a transform zone . In the late Triassic and early Jurassic there were two stages of rifting involving extension and subsidence on the western margin of Iberia.  It also extended the western margin. The Iberian Abyssal Plain, off the west coast of Portugal and Spain, formed 126 Ma. This separated Newfoundland's Grand Banks, with Galicia Bank and Flemish Cap being split at 118 Ma. By Early Cretaceous, 110 Ma rifting occurs on west and north west edges.

During the time of the supercontinent Pangea, the Iberian plate was joined to Armorica (Northern France). During the break-up of Pangea, in the early Cretaceous, the Bay of Biscay started opening around 126 Ma and completed by 85 Ma. This created the Biscay Abyssal Plain, and parted the Iberian plate from the Trevelyan Escarpment. During this time Iberia rotated anticlockwise relative to Eurasia.  This caused the subduction of the Ligurian Basin onto the eastern side.  This formed the Betic nappe stack.  After 85 Ma the Atlantic Ocean opening started between Ireland and Greenland. This left the Bay of Biscay as a failed rift .

Cenozoic
The rotation of the Iberia and its relation to the formation of the Pyrenees has been difficult to decipher with certainty. Detailed aeromagnetic measurements from the sea floor offshore of the Grand Banks of Newfoundland to show that Iberia moved as part of the African plate from late Cretaceous to mid-Eocene time, with a plate boundary extending westward from the Bay of Biscay. When motion along this boundary ceased, a boundary linking extension in the Kings Trough to compression along the Pyrenees came into existence.

Since the late Oligocene, the Iberian plate has been moving as part of the Eurasian plate, with the boundary between Eurasia and Africa situated along the Azores–Gibraltar fracture zone.

Continued rotation of the Iberian plate in the early Miocene once again separated the Iberian plate from Eurasia opening the Betic Corridor, a strait of water connecting the Mediterranean Sea with the Atlantic Ocean. As the Iberian plate rotated, it closed the Betic Corridor approximately 5.96 million years ago during the Messinian period of the Miocene, precipitating the Messinian Salinity Crisis, a period when the Mediterranean Sea evaporated partly or completely .

Iberian geology

The core of the Iberian Peninsula consists of a Hercynian cratonic block known as the Iberian Massif. On the northeast this is bounded by The Pyrenean fold belt, and on the southeast it is bounded by the Betic Foldchain. These twofold chains are part of the Alpine belt. To the west, the peninsula is delimited by the continental boundary formed by the magma poor opening of the Atlantic Ocean. The Hercynian Foldbelt is mostly buried by Mesozoic and Tertiary cover rocks to the east, but nevertheless outcrops through the Iberian Chain and the Catalan Coastal Ranges.

See also

Bibliography

Notes

References

 
 
 
 
 
 
 
 
 
 
 
 
 
 

Tectonic plates
Geology of the Alps
Historical continents